St. Jones may refer to:

 St. Jones River, a river flowing to Delaware Bay in central Delaware, United States
 St. Jones Within, Newfoundland and Labrador, Canada